Admiral of the Fleet Vladimir Vasilyevich Masorin (born August 24, 1947) is a retired Russian admiral who commanded the Caspian Flotilla in 1996–2002 and the Black Sea Fleet in 2002–2005. In September 2005, he was appointed the commander-in-chief of the Russian Navy.

The newspaper Kommersant speculated that Admiral Masorin was a temporary appointment until the new chief of the Main Naval Staff, appointed at the same time, took command of the Navy.

Masorin completed the P.S. Nakhimov Black Sea Higher Naval School in 1970. He served as principal warfare officer on the Kashin class destroyer Smyshleny of the Northern Fleet. In 1977 he completed additional officer training and became executive officer of the Kashin class destroyer Ognevoy. In 1980 he became commanding officer of the Sovremennyy class destroyer Otchayannyy and in 1983 Masorin became chief of staff of the Northern Fleet's destroyer squadron. After completing the N. G. Kuznetsov Naval Academy Masorin was promoted to commander of the Northern Fleet's destroyer squadron.

Following completion of the General Staff Academy, Masorin was promoted to commander of the Caspian Flotilla in 1996 and the Black Sea Fleet in 2002. Masorin was promoted to commander-in-chief of the Russian Navy and to the rank of fleet admiral in 2005.

On August 24, 2007, Masorin became the first Russian recipient of the Legion of Merit (Commander) from the United States. His award was conferred by U.S. Navy Chief of Naval Operations Michael Mullen, for meritorious conduct to increase cooperation and interoperability with the U.S. Navy and the North Atlantic Treaty Organization from September 2005 to August 2007. Under his leadership the Russian Federation's navy participated in Active Endeavor, a NATO maritime counter-terrorism operation in the Mediterranean Sea. He consistently advocated continued Russian participation in the joint and combined military exercises including BALTOPS, Northern Eagle FRUKUS and Pacific Eagle.

On July 10, 2006, Masorin was on board a Russian Navy-operated Tupolev Tu134 which crashed on takeoff from Gvardeyskoye AFB, Simferapol. He, along with the 27 other occupants survived the crash and subsequent fire.

His visit to Washington, D.C., during which he received the Legion of Merit was first official visit of a Russian Federation Navy commander-in-chief in eleven years. His predecessors as Russian Navy commander-in-chief previously making official visits to Washington were Fleet Admirals Vladimir Chernavin and Felix Gromov.
 
Fleet Admiral Masorin retired in late 2007 after reaching his 60th birthday.

Masorin remains as advisor on the staff of the Russian Minister of Defense. He is married with two sons.

Links and sources

http://www.kommersant.com/page.asp?idr=1&id=606050 
http://www.mil-embedded.com/news/db/?7815

1947 births
Living people
Russian admirals
Commanders-in-chief of the Russian Navy
Soviet Navy personnel
Recipients of the Order of Military Merit (Russia)
Commanders of the Legion of Merit